Centre is the usual name for the central area of Badalona, a locality in the metropolitan area of Barcelona (Catalonia, Spain). It's located in the District 1 by the Mediterranean Sea, and is a commercial and residential area with good transportation connections. It had 1344 inhabitants in the 2010 census.

Barcelona Metro
The neighbourhood is served by Barcelona Metro stations Pep Ventura and Badalona Pompeu Fabra, on L2.

References

External links
Badacentre.com

Geography of Badalona